St. Claret College in Bengaluru, India, is a Catholic institution of higher learning established by the Claretian Missionaries of the Province of Bangalore, a congregation of Catholic priest  and brothers. Founded in 2005, SCC is permanently affiliated Bangalore University and is NAAC accredited A+ grade with a CGPA of 3.31 on 4. SCC offers several undergraduate courses in Commerce, Management, Science, Computer Science and Humanities. The postgraduate programs that SCC offers are: Masters in Business Administration (MBA), Masters in Psychology (M.Sc.) Masters in Commerce (M.Com) and Masters in Social Work (MSW).

Origins 

Educational activities at the Bangalore campus began in 1987 with the establishment of St Claret School. The second phase of the growth of the educational mission was the opening of St. Claret Pre-University College. After the pre-university college was established, the third phase of growth was the launching of St Claret College, as an affiliated college of Bangalore University in 2005.

Growth of SCC 
SCCB began with 50 students and 3 full-time faculty in 2005. It has grown to 2,200 students and 105 full-time faculty and staff. In 2022, SCC has been accredited A+ grade by NAAC with a CGPA of 3.31 on 4. St. Claret Institute of Management (SCIM) was established in 2011. SCIM, affiliated to Bangalore University and approved by AICTE, offers Masters in Business Administration (MBA). St. Claret Evening College, affiliated to Bangalore University which was established in 2019 offers a B.Com (Bachelor of Commerce) to help students work during the day and study in the evening. The college has a four-story building facility, an 800 capacity auditorium, state-of-the-art seminar and conference halls, a library with 25,000 books and online resources, round the clock wi-fi facility, canteen, cafeteria; training in out-door sports such as football, cricket, basketball, volleyball, kho-kho, kabaddi and coaching in athletics. Two hostels for girls are managed by religious Sisters. The College management takes care of hostel for boys. SCC has a National Cadet Corps (NCC) unit that grooms the youth into disciplined and patriotic citizens. The National Service Scheme (NSS) unit of SCC provides hands-on experience to the student in delivering community service.

Diploma and certification programmes 

St. Claret College provides several add on and diploma programs for the skill development of the student community. These are aimed at developing the efficiency and competitiveness of the students. Forty-eight certification and diploma programs are offered by SCC currently.

Linkages and collaborations 
SCC has been selected by MHRD’s Innovation Cell (MIC) to formally constitute an Innovation Council in the college for the promotion of innovation among its students through various activities. The college has entered into linkages and collaborations with several governmental and non-governmental organizations, colleges, universities and industries for academic exchange, sharing of expertise and organization of seminars, conferences and workshops. The following is a list of leading organizations with whom SCC has entered into collaborative agreements: 
 ACM-W: Association for Computing Machinery for Women 
 AWAKE: Association of Women Entrepreneurs of Karnataka 
 CSI: Computer Society of India
 Edumerge Solutions Pvt. Ltd.  
 ICT Academy
 IMS Proschool Pvt. Ltd.
 ISDC- International Skill Development Corporation 
 Jetking Learning Center
 K2 Learning – Institute of Commerce Education 
 KASSIA: Karnataka Small Scale Industries Association 
 KSCST: Karnataka State Council for Science and Technology\ 
 Mark Computer Education 
 Miles education 
 PIA- Peenya Industries Association 
 SAPTAC – Software Training Institute
 Simplilearn Online Education 
 Stocktale Education Centre, Bangalore 
 Systems Domain: Computer Software Training Institute  
 Tech India of Times of India

Placement and career guidance 
The Training & Placement (T&P) Cell of SCC is the chief facilitator for the students to obtain placements best suited to them and be the primary liaison between industry and the institute. The main goal of Placement Cell is to provide the best training on aptitude, resume building, group discussion, technical training and interview skills. The Placement Cell also plays a crucial role in suitably placing the alumni whenever required. The Placement Committee members at the department level execute the training plan after assessing the core competencies of the students. They constantly track the students’ performance to ensure improvement through periodic assessment tests/psychometric tests. These periodic assessment tests aid students to identify their areas of strength they can upgrade, and their areas of improvement which they can focus on. The Placement Committee also focuses on student internships for them to get hands-on experience, improve leadership skills, gain knowledge on specific industries and their operations. A few leading organizations that hire SCC’s graduates are Legato Healthcare Technology; SLK Software; Gallagher; Cognizant; DXC Technology; L&T Infotech; Accenture; Amazon; Deloitte; Capgemini; ICICI Bank; Yes Bank; Axis Bank; HDFC Bank; Tech Mahindra; Clear Tax; PWC; Morgan Stanley; JP Morgan; EY; KPMG; and Genpact.

Extension activities 
Learning to serve is an integral part of the Claretian education and it forms one of the core values of SCC. To realize this mission, the college has included village adoption, training and awareness programs, seminars and workshops on social issues, and it also conducts awareness rallies as a mandatory part of the education. Various extension activities such as health awareness programs, free eye camps for students, staff and people of the neighbourhood and blood donation camps are organized by the National Service Scheme (NSS) of SCC. 

The National Cadet Corps (NCC) of the college organizes leadership camps, cleaning campaigns, environmental and community development activities. The Women Empowerment Committee organizes extension activities related to gender issues, conducts awareness rallies, performs street plays and educates women in the neighbourhood on their rights. The extension activities related to environmental awareness programs such as Swachh Bharath Abhiyan, environment awareness camps, and awareness rallies on garbage segregation into bio-degradable and non-bio-degradable waste are organized by the Environmental Club of SCC.  Some of the other extension activities include awareness rallies and programs on HIV& AIDS, drug, alcohol and tobacco addictions. During the Covid-19 pandemic, the college community was extensively involved in awareness generation activities, relief work through supply of groceries, food, medical equipment and medicines.  Vaccine drives were also organized in the campus for the benefit of people in the neighborhood.

References 

 SCCB Student Handbook 2022-23

External links 

 SCCB web site

Catholic universities and colleges in India
Colleges in Bangalore
2005 establishments in Karnataka